Capillovirus is a genus of viruses in the order Tymovirales, in the family Betaflexiviridae. Plants, pome fruits, citrus, and pear serve as natural hosts. There are four species in this genus. Diseases associated with this genus include: abnormal graft union, possibly black necrotic leaf spot disease.

Taxonomy
The following species are assigned to the genus:
Apple stem grooving virus
Cherry virus A
Currant virus A
Mume virus A

Structure
Viruses in Capillovirus are non-enveloped, with flexuous and filamentous geometries. The diameter is around 12 nm, with a length of 640 nm. Genomes are linear, around 6.5-7.5kb in length. The genome codes for 3 proteins.

Life cycle
Viral replication is cytoplasmic. Entry into the host cell is achieved by penetration into the host cell. Replication follows the positive stranded RNA virus replication model. Positive stranded rna virus transcription is the method of transcription. The virus exits the host cell by tubule-guided viral movement.
Plants, pome fruits, citrus, and  pear serve as the natural host. The virus is transmitted via a vector (by seeds and  no known). Transmission routes are vector, mechanical, and seed borne.

References

External links
 Viralzone: Capillovirus
 ICTV

Betaflexiviridae
Virus genera
Viral citrus diseases